The Arrondissement of Torhout was a short-lived arrondissement in present-day Belgium. It was created out of the Arrondissement of Bruges in 1818, and it already ceased to exist in 1823.

Torhout